The Laws of the General Assembly of the Commonwealth of Pennsylvania (also known as the Pamphlet Laws or just Laws of Pennsylvania, as well as the Acts of the General Assembly of the Commonwealth of Pennsylvania) is the compilation of session laws passed by the Pennsylvania General Assembly.

See also
 Pennsylvania Consolidated Statutes
 Law of Pennsylvania
 United States Statutes at Large

References

Government of Pennsylvania
Pennsylvania law